The Commerce, Justice, Science, and Related Agencies Appropriations Act, 2016 is the appropriations bill for the Department of Commerce, Department of Justice, NASA, the National Science Foundation, the Office of Science and Technology Policy, and several independent agencies for the fiscal year 2016.

Legislative history
On June 16, the Senate Committee on Appropriations reported the bill to the full Senate with amendments. It later became Division B of the Consolidated Appropriations Act, 2016, which was signed into law by President Barack Obama on December 18, 2015.

Line items

References 

Acts of the 114th United States Congress
United States federal appropriations legislation